A select number of decisions from the Constitutional Court of Bosnia and Herzegovina have proven to have a profound effect on legal and political situation in Bosnia and Herzegovina. The notable decisions of the Court are listed in chronological order.

Decision on the constitutionality of the peace agreement

On 13 October 1997, the Croatian 1861 Law Party and the Bosnia-Herzegovina 1861 Law Party requested the Constitutional Court to annul several decisions and to confirm one decision of the Supreme Court of the Republic of Bosnia and Herzegovina and, more importantly, to review the constitutionality of the General Framework Agreement for Peace in Bosnia and Herzegovina, since they alleged that the agreement violated the Constitution of Bosnia and Herzegovina in a way that it undermined the integrity of the state and that it may cause the dissolution of Bosnia and Herzegovina. The Court reached the conclusion that it is not competent to decide the disputes in regard to the mentioned decisions, since the applicants were not subjects that were identified in Article VI.3 (a) of the Constitution, in regard to those who can refer disputes to the Court. The Court also rejected the other request stating:

This was one of the early cases in which the Court had to deal with the question of the legal nature of the Constitution. By making the remark in the manner of obiter dictum concerning the Annex IV (the Constitution) and the rest of the peace agreement, the Court actually "established the ground for legal unity" of the entire peace agreement, which further implied that all the annexes are in the hierarchical equality. In later decisions the Court confirmed this by using other annexes of the peace agreement as a direct base for the analysis and not only in the context of systematic interpretation of the Annex IV. However, since the Court rejected the presented request of the appellants, it did not go into details concerning the controversial questions of the legality of the process in which the new Constitution (Annex IV) came to power, and replaced the former Constitution of the Republic of Bosnia and Herzegovina. The Court used the same reasoning to dismiss the similar claim in a later case.

Decision on the constituency of peoples

On 12 February 1998, Alija Izetbegović, at the time Chair of the Presidency of Bosnia and Herzegovina, instituted proceedings before the Constitutional Court for an evaluation of the consistency of the Constitution of the Republika Srpska and the Constitution of the Federation of Bosnia and Herzegovina with the Constitution of Bosnia and Herzegovina. The request was supplemented on 30 March 1998 when the applicant specified which provisions of the Entities' Constitutions he considered to be unconstitutional. The four partial decisions were made in a year 2000, by which many of articles of the constitutions of entities were found to be unconstitutional, which had a great impact on politics of Bosnia and Herzegovina, because there was a need to adjust the current state in the country with the decision of the Court. There was a narrow majority (5-4), in the favor of the applicant. In its third partial decision, among other things, the Court stated:

The Court dealt with the following questions: the legal status entities, legal nature of the Constitution of B&H, prohibition of discrimination, equality of constituent peoples, the status of the orthodox church in RS and equality of language and script. The formal name of this item is U-5/98, but it is widely known as the "Decision on the constituency of peoples", referring to the Court's interpretation of the significance of the phrase "constituent peoples" used in the Preamble of the Constitution of Bosnia and Herzegovina. The decision was also the basis for other notable cases that came before the court.

Decision on the Council of Ministers

On 11 February 1999, Mirko Banjac, at the time Deputy Chair of the House of Representatives of the Parliamentary Assembly of Bosnia and Herzegovina, instituted a request for, among other issues, the evaluation of the constitutionality of the Law on the Council of Ministers of Bosnia and Herzegovina and the Ministries of Bosnia and Herzegovina (Official Gazette of Bosnia and Herzegovina, No. 4/97) which foresaw the existence of two Co-Chairs and a vice-chair of the Council of Ministers. In its decision the Court had, among other things, stated the following:

The Court gave the Parliamentary Assembly of Bosnia and Herzegovina a three-month period from the date of publication of its decision on this matter in the "Official Gazette of Bosnia and Herzegovina" to bring the contested provisions of the Law in conformity with the Constitution of Bosnia and Herzegovina. After the Parliamentary Assembly failed to do that the Court, acting upon the request of the applicant and pursuant to its decision of 14 August 1999 and the legal standpoint exemplified in the reasons of the decision, established that certain provisions of the Law on Ministers and Ministries shall cease to be valid.

Decision on the relationship between the Court and the Human Rights Chamber for B&H

On 20 April 1998, the Office of the Public Attorney of the Federation of Bosnia and Herzegovina challenged the Decision of the Human Rights Chamber for Bosnia and Herzegovina in Case No. CH/96/30, claiming that it was not in conformity with the national laws and international conventions. The Constitutional Court had to decide whether it had an appellate jurisdiction over the decisions of the Human Rights Chamber for Bosnia and Herzegovina, the later being an institution of a special nature also vested with judicial functions with respect to alleged violations of
human rights as provided for in Annex 6 to the Dayton Agreement, unlike the Constitutional Court regulated in Annex 4 (the Constitution of Bosnia and Herzegovina) of the same Agreement. In its majority decision (4-1), the Court had, among other things, held the following:

 
Thus, the Court held that it had no jurisdiction and that the appeal had to be rejected. The Court had recognized that the situation created by the Dayton Agreement might result in certain problems such as possible conflicting case law concerning some human rights issues, however it also concluded that the problem was mostly of a temporary nature since the Agreement foresaw the possibility of the transfer of the competence in this area to the institutions of Bosnia and Herzegovina dealing with human rights. The Human Rights Chamber of B&H existed in the period of 1996–2003, and after 1 January 2004 new cases alleging human rights violations are decided by the Constitutional Court of B&H.

Decisions concerning the High Representative in Bosnia and Herzegovina

Decision on the competency to review the laws enacted by the High Representative

On 7 February 2000, eleven members of the House of Representatives of the
Parliamentary Assembly of B&H initiated proceedings before the Constitutional Court for the evaluation of the constitutionality of the Law on State Border
Service that was enacted by the High Representative for B&H on 13 January 2000, and later published in the Official Gazette of B&H. Among other issues, the applicants contended that the High Representative did not have the normative powers to impose a law in the absence of a vote by the Parliamentary Assembly. In its majority decision (7-2), the Court had, among other things, held the following:

Thus, although the Constitutional Court declined to review the "exercise" of the powers of the High Representative with regards the possible justification of his intervention in the legislative process of B&H, the Court did declare that it has the competency to review his actions when he acts as a legislator. The Court subsequently determined that the law reviewed was in conformity with the Constitution.

Decision on the authority of the High Representative to change the laws

On 12 October 2000, thirty-four representatives of the National Assembly of Republika Srpska submitted a request to the Constitutional Court of B&H for the evaluation of the conformity of the Decision on Amending the Law on Travel Documents of B&H, adopted by the High Representative on 29 September 2000, with the Constitution of B&H. Besides the general claims that the High Representative can only interpret laws, and thus cannot create them, the applicants, among other issues, asserted that the High Representative cannot amend the Law on Travel Documents by a decision, since a decision represents an act of weaker legal force than laws. In its majority decision, the Court had, among other things, held the following:

Thus, the Court held that the High Representative has the authority not only to enact the laws, but also to change them, and although the Court could not review the authority of the High Representative in that regard it could review the laws that he had enacted or changed. It also held that the Decision Amending the Law on Travel Documents of Bosnia and Herzegovina was in conformity with the Constitution of B&H.

Decision on the competency to review decisions of the High Representative to remove public officials

On 27 March 2001, 37 representatives of the House of Representatives of the Parliament of the Federation of B&H, as well as Edhem Bičakčić, filed an appeal against the Decision of the High Representative for B&H to remove Edhem Bičakćić from the office of director general of "Elektroprivreda BiH" (public company for distribution of electric energy) and to prohibit him from holding any public or appointed office unless or until such time as the High Representative may expressly authorize him to hold such office. Bičakćić was removed on the grounds of criminal offenses that were allegedly committed during the performance of his duties as the Prime Minister of the Federation of B&H. The appellants alleged that the challenged Decision of the High Representative was unconstitutional in regard to both the competence to take such a decision and the substance of the decision, particularly because it was taken, in their opinion, without applying any criteria and without applying a fair procedure for establishing the truth. Thus, the applicants asked the Court to grant the appeals and quash the decision of the High Representative. In its unanimous decision, the Court had, among other things, held the following:

Thus, the Constitutional Court held that it cannot review a decision of the High Representative to remove a public official under Article VI.3 (a) Constitution of Bosnia and Herzegovina.

Decision on right to effective remedy after removal from public office by the High Representative

In 2005, Milorad Bilbija and Dragan Kalinić lodged appeals before the Constitutional Court against decisions of ordinary courts that had dismissed their appeals against the decisions of the High Representative concerning them. Bilbija was removed by the decision of the High Representative from his position of Deputy Head of the Operative Administration of the Intelligence and Security Agency in Banja Luka and from other public and party positions, while Kalinić was removed from his position as Chairman of the National Assembly of Republika Srpska and President of the Serbian Democratic Party. Both were also barred from other public and party duties that they were performing, and from holding any official, elective or appointive public office and from running in elections and from office within political parties unless or until such time the High Representative, by his subsequent decision, expressly authorizes them to do or hold the same, also ending any entitlements they had to receive remuneration or any privileges or status they had from those positions. Both complained that this violated their rights to effective legal remedy, to a fair trial, to no punishment without law, to freedom of expression, to freedom of assembly and association, to non-discrimination and to free elections. In its unanimous decision, the Court had, among other things, held the following:

Thus, the Court held that the appellants' right to an effective legal remedy under Article 13 of the European Convention has been violated, and that Bosnia and Herzegovina had a positive obligation to protect the constitutional rights of appellants in that regard. Up until this decision the Court had been rejecting the appeals lodged against the Decisions of the High Representative, initially finding itself not competent and subsequently holding that those appeals were premature. The Court however did not decide in merits on what standard of human rights the High Representative was to comply with, nor did it order the establishment of independent judicial body to review decisions of the High Representative in similar cases. Decision of the Court led to a vigorous response from the High Representative: on 23 March 2007 he issued a decision removing any practical effect from the Courts decision. Kalinić and Bilbija submitted the application before the European Court of Human Rights, but their application was declared incompatible ratione personae. Subsequently, the High Representative lifted the ban imposed on Dragan Kalinić.

Decision quashing the ruling of a court based on a decision by the High Representative

On 15 October 2001, Ante Jelavić lodged an appeal with the Constitutional Court against the ruling of the Cantonal Court in Sarajevo which dismissed Jelavić's appeal against the ruling of an investigative judge of the Cantonal Court in Sarajevo on the conduct of investigation against Jelavić. Although the judge confirmed that the alleged offenses were committed in Mostar, he based his competency, among other things, on the Decision of the High Representative of 26 April 2001, on establishing the territorial and subject-matter competence of the Cantonal Court in Sarajevo "for conducting investigation and first instance trial against perpetrators of all criminal acts" arising from certain events in which the appellant was allegedly involved. Jelavić raised an objection to the territorial competence of the Cantonal Court in Sarajevo, stating that the Cantonal Court in Mostar was competent for conducting the proceedings and that his right to a fair trial was violated. In its unanimous decision, the Court had, among other things, held the following:

The Court granted the appeal of Ante Jelavić, and quashed the rulings of the Cantonal Court of Sarajevo and designated the Cantonal Court in Mostar as territorially competent to conduct the investigation. This was also the first and the only time the Constitutional Court had determined that a legislative measure of the High Representative was unconstitutional.

Decision on imposition of arbitration by the High Representative

On 29 June 2001, Živko Radišić, a member of the Presidency of B&H submitted a request to the Constitutional Court for deciding the dispute between the Republika Srpska and Federation of B&H on the Inter-Entity Boundary Line between Dobrinja I and Dobrinja IV and for review of the constitutionality of the Decision of the High Representative which ties both the Republika Srpska and the Federation of B&H into final and binding arbitration on the Inter-Entity Boundary Line in the Sarajevo suburbs of Dobrinja I and IV, No. 84/01 of 5 February 2001 and the Arbitration Award by an independent Arbitrator for Dobrinja I and IV. In its unanimous decision, the Court had, among other things, held the following:

Thus, the Court rejected the submission as inadmissible, as it held that it is not competent to adopt a decision.

Decision on jurisdiction to review the laws of Bosnia and Herzegovina

On 8 February 2002, thirty-three representatives of the People's Assembly of the
Republika Srpska submitted a request to the Constitutional Court of Bosnia and Herzegovina for a review of constitutionality of Article 18.8, paragraph 3 of the Election Law of Bosnia and Herzegovina, which they considered to be discriminatory. In admissibility stage the Court had to consider the provisions of the Article VI.3 of the Constitution of Bosnia and Herzegovina which does not expressly grant the jurisdiction to the Court to review the constitutionality of the laws adopted at the state level. The Court unanimously held the following:

Although the Court had in the case no. U 1/99 implicitly held that it had jurisdiction to review the laws adopted at the state level, this was the first time it had expressly done so. In the merits stage the Court ruled against the applicants.

Decision on the insignia of entities

On 12 April 2004, Sulejman Tihić, then Chairman of the Presidency of Bosnia and Herzegovina, filed a request with the Constitutional Court of Bosnia and Herzegovina for the review of constitutionality of Articles 1 and 2 of the Law on the Coat of Arms and Flag of the Federation of Bosnia and Herzegovina (Official Gazette of Federation of BiH No. 21/96 and 26/96), Articles 1, 2 and 3 of the Constitutional Law on the Flag, Coat of Arms and Anthem of the Republika Srpska (Official Gazette of the Republika Srpska No. 19/92), Articles 2 and 3 of the Law on the Use of Flag, Coat of Arms and Anthem (Official Gazette of the Republika Srpska No. 4/93) and Articles 1 and 2 of the Law on the Family Patron-Saint's Days and Church Holidays of the Republika Srpska (Official Gazette of Republika Srpska No. 19/92). On 2 December 2004 the applicant submitted a supplement to the request. Two partial decisions were made in a year 2006, when the Court found that the coat of arms and flag of the Federation of B&H, and coat of arms, anthem, family patron-saint days and church holidays of Republika Srpska were unconstitutional. In its decision, among other things, the Court stated:

The formal name of the item is U-4/04, but it is widely known as "Decision on the insignia of entities" (Bosnian: Odluka o obilježjima entiteta), since its merritum was about the symbols of entities. The Court has ordered the Parliament of the Federation of Bosnia and Herzegovina and the National Assembly of Republika Srpska to bring the contested legal documents in line with the Constitution of Bosnia and Herzegovina within six months from the publishing date of its decision in the Official Gazette of Bosnia and Herzegovina. Since the harmonisation was not done in that granted time-limit, that Court has, on 27 January 2007, adopted the Ruling on failure to enforce in which it established that the contested articles of the interpreted legal documents shall cease to be in force as of the date following the publishing date of the Ruling in Official Gazette of Bosnia and Herzegovina. On 16 June 2007, the Government of Republika Srpska had adopted the provisional emblem of Republika Srpska, until it adopted the new Coat of Arms of Republika Srpska. It had also decided to use the melody of its former anthem "Bože pravde" as its new intermezzo anthem, but the Constitutional Court of Republika Srpska has declared such use of melody as unconstitutional as well, so the new anthem, "Moja Republika" was adopted. Both the new anthem (in relation to words moja zemlja – "my land") and new coat of arms have been contested by Bosniak members of National Assembly of Republika Srpska in front of the Constitutional Court of Republika Srpska. The Court declared the coat of arms to be unconstitutional since it did not represent Bosniaks in any way, while it rejected the claim in relation to the anthem.

Decision on the names of the cities

Decision on removal of prefix "Srpski" ("Serbian") from names of the municipalities

On 30 July 2001, Sejfudin Tokić, Deputy Chair of the House of Peoples of the Parliamentary Assembly of Bosnia and Herzegovina at the time of its filing request, filed with the Constitutional Court of Bosnia and Herzegovina a request for a review of constitutionality of Articles 11 and 11(a) of the Law on Territorial Organization and Local Self-Government (Official Gazette of the Republika Srpska Nos. 11/94, 6/95, 26/95, 15/96, 17/96, 19/96, and 6/97) and the title itself of the Law on the Town of Srpsko Sarajevo as well as its Articles 1 and 2 (Official Gazette of the Republika Srpska Nos. 25/93, 8/96, 27/96 and 33/97). The Court made its decision in 2004, in which it declared the laws that changed the names of the cities to ones with prefixes "srpski" (Serbian), were unconstitutional and had to be changed (which was done later). In its decision, among other things, the Court stated:

 
The formal name of the item is U-44/01, but it is widely known as the "Decision on the names of the cities" (Bosnian: Odluka o nazivima gradova).

This judgement is important not only because it was unanimous (no division according to ethnic lines inside the Court), but also because it elaborates the collective equality of the constituent peoples and accepts the symbolic importance of names.

Decision on removal of prefix "Bosanski" ("Bosnian") from names of the municipalities

On 7 September 2009, the Bosniak Caucus in the Council of Peoples of the Republika Srpska, represented by its President Edin Ramić, lodged an appeal with the Constitutional Court of Bosnia and Herzegovina against the decision of the Council for the Protection of Vital Interest of the Constitutional Court of the Republika Srpska (the "Council") No. UV-2/09 of 8 July 2009. At the same time the appellant sought a review of the constitutionality of the Rules of Procedure on the Operations of the Constitutional Court of the Republika Srpska and, within that request, sought adoption of an interim measure.

Previously the Chairman of the Council of Peoples of the Republika Srpska initiated the procedure for the protection of vital national interest of Bosniak people under the Law on Territorial Organization of the Republika Srpska before the Council since that Law did not include prefix "Bosnian" in front of the names of the municipalities of Brod and Kostajnica, which had such prefix before, and this prefix was also absent in the names of the municipalities whose names had been previously changed (Gradiška, Novi Grad, Šamac and Kozarska Dubica). The council had determined that the Law had not violated the vital national interest of Bosniak people. The appellants claimed that the council had violated the provisions of the Constitution of Bosnia and Herzegovina relating to non-discrimination, right to return and right to a fair hearing, as well as provisions of ECHR relating to non-discrimination and a right to a fair hearing. The majority (7-1) of the Court decided against the applicant. In its decision, among other things, the Court stated:

The Court also decided that the decision of the Council for the Protection of Vital Interest of the Constitutional Court of the Republika Srpska is to be regarded as a "judgment of the court" in the meaning of the Constitution of Bosnia and Herzegovina, against which an application can be made to the Constitutional Court. However, the Court decided that it did not have the jurisdiction to review the constitutionality of the Rules of Procedure on the Operations of the Constitutional Court of the Republika Srpska since the collective right of the constitutional peoples of the protection of the vital national interests is a right of political nature that is not covered by the scope of "civil rights and obligations" as understood by the Constitution or the ECHR.

Decisions on relation of the law of B&H and European Convention on Human Rights

Decision on the conformity of certain provisions of the Constitution of B&H with the ECHR and its Protocols

On 27 April 2004, Sulejman Tihić, at the time Chair of the Presidency of Bosnia and Herzegovina, instituted proceedings before the Constitutional Court for a review of conformity of the provisions of Articles IV.1, IV.1(a), IV.3(b) and V.1) of the Constitution of Bosnia and Herzegovina with the provision of Article 14 of the European Convention for the Protection of Human Rights and Fundamental Freedoms (henceforth: European Convention) and Article 3 of Protocol No. 1 to the European Convention. Since the noted Articles of the Constitution establish a de iure discrimination, especially in relation to "Others" (i.e. those that are not members of "constituent peoples"), a question arose about a possible conflict between international and domestic law, moreover since the Constitution itself states (in its Article II.2), that the European Convention "shall have the priority over all other law". The applicant argued that this meant that the European Convention has a priority even over the Constitution and not only sub-constitutional legal documents. The Court rejected the request as inadmissible, stating:

With this decision the Court has upheld the discriminatory nature of the Constitution and laws that find their legal basis in it. As a result, Jakob Finci, the president of Jewish community of Bosnia and Herzegovina, Dervo Sejdić, a Roma who has been legally abridged from becoming a member of the Presidency of Bosnia and Herzegovina or a member of House of Peoples of Bosnia and Herzegovina, have filed separate suits against Bosnia and Herzegovina in front of European Court of Human Rights, which acknowledged Finci's and Sejdić's ineligibility for presidency and House of Peoples to be in violation of the European Convention on Human Rights.

Decision on conformity of Election Law of B&H with ECHR

On 6 September 2005, Sulejman Tihić, Member of the Presidency of Bosnia and Herzegovina, filed a request with the Constitutional Court of Bosnia and Herzegovina for a review of conformity of Article 8.1 paragraphs 1 and 2 of the Election Law of Bosnia and Herzegovina with Article 3 of Protocol No. 1 to the European Convention for the Protection of Human Rights and Fundamental Freedoms and Article 1 of Protocol No. 12 to the European Convention, and Articles 2(1)(c) and 5(1)(c) of the International Convention on Elimination of All Forms of Racial Discrimination. This particularly related to the manner in which the members of the Presidency of B&H were elected, as well as total bar from the Presidency of the "Others" in the Election Law of B&H, which reflected almost identical constitutional provisions. The majority (7-2) of the Court rejected the request as inadmissible. In its decision, among other things, the Court stated:

Unlike the case U-5/04, here three judges (Grewe and Palavrić dissenting and Feldman submitting separate opinion) thought that the case was admissible since it did not challenge the Constitutional provisions but the Election Law. Still, the majority decided not to go to the merits stage.

Decision on the appeal of Ilijaz Pilav

On 20 September 2006, Party for Bosnia and Herzegovina and Ilijaz Pilav filed an appeal with the Constitutional Court of Bosnia and Herzegovina against the Ruling of Court of BiH of 10 August 2006, and Decisions of Central Election Commission of 1 August 2006 and of 24 July 2006, which rejected the application for certification of the candidate Pilav on the Party's candidate list for the Presidency of Bosnia and Herzegovina, as Serb member, stating that he cannot be elected from the territory of Republika Srpska as he declares himself as Bosniak. Pilav and the Party argued that their rights have been violated, particularly that Pilav was discriminated on national/ethnic basis. The majority (7-2) of the Court decided against the applicants. In its decision, among other things, the Court stated:

In this case the Court, for the first time, rejected the request on the merits, rather that declaring it as prima facie inadmissible. Two of the dissenting judges (Grewe and Palavrić) were of the opinion that differential treatment challenged by the appeal is not justified in an objective or in a proportionate manner.

Decision regarding the general principles of international law

On 30 June 2009, Ilija Filipović, Chairman of the House of Peoples of Bosnia and Herzegovina filed a request for review of the constitutionality of the Law on Protection of Domestic Production under the CEFTA. He also requested the Constitutional Court to issue an interim measure whereby it would suspend the application of the challenged Law pending a decision on the request, which the Court granted. One of the initial problems for the Court was the fact that the Constitution of Bosnia and Herzegovina does not contain any explicit provision defining the rank of international treaties in domestic law or attributing competence in this field to the Constitutional Court. In addition, the Court had to interpret the Article III(3)(b) which provides that the "general principles of international law shall be an integral part of the law of Bosnia and Herzegovina and the Entities". The majority (6-3) of the Court decided in the favor of the applicant. In its decision, among other things, the Court stated:

Thus, the Court established that the Law on the Protection of the Domestic Production under the CEFTA is inconsistent with Article III(3)(b) of the Constitution of Bosnia and Herzegovina and that it is quashed in its entirety.

In their Separate Joint Dissenting Opinion judges Feldman and Pantiru recognized the importance of pacta sunt servanda principle but still held that it has no more weight than laws passed by the legislators at the state or entity level and that it does not in any case entail giving provisions of treaties a status superior to that of Laws under the Constitution. Similarly, the President of the Court, Simović, in his dissenting opinion noted that "if interpreted in this manner, the entire international treaty law obtains a constitutional law level, which has not been the intention of the author of the Constitution."

Decision on proportional representation in legislature of B&H

On 16 November 2009, Sulejman Tihić, then Chairman of the House of Peoples of Bosnia and Herzegovina, filed a request with the Constitutional Court of Bosnia and Herzegovina for the review of constitutionality of several Articles of the Election Law of Bosnia and Herzegovina and the Rules of Procedure of the House of Representatives of Bosnia and Herzegovina. The applicant claimed that although the principle of proportional representation of the three constituent peoples and other citizens has been respected in the executive of the Federation of BiH and Republika Srpska, as well as in the organs of the public authority and courts in the entities, it is not respected with regards the structure of the legislature in Bosnia and Herzegovina (at the state and entity levels) according to the census from 1991, and that the particular voting procedure in the House of Representatives, popularly called "the entity voting", has thus been transformed into "ethnic voting" where the ethnic majority from one or the other entity can promote its interests, as opposed to the interests and will of the other two constituent peoples from either entities, as well as the will of other citizens from the territory of those entities. Thus, the applicant claimed that the indicated provisions of the Electoral Law are not in conformity with the lines 3, 8 and 9 of the Preamble of the Constitution of Bosnia and Herzegovina and with the Article I/2 of the Constitution. The Court unanimously decided against the applicant. In its decision, among other things, the Court stated:

The Court had particularly reiterated its previous decisions in the cases U-5/98 and U-8/04, with regards the notion of "effective participation of the constituent peoples in state authorities" which in principle means that officials appointed to positions in institutions of Bosnia and Herzegovina should be representative reflection of advanced co-existence of all peoples in Bosnia and Herzegovina, but that if such participation falls outside the constitutional framework, it must never be carried out or imposed at the expense of efficient operation of the state and its authorities.

Decisions on international position of entities

Decision on constitutionality of political lobbying of foreign governments and international organizations by RS

On 15 September 2008, Haris Silajdžić, at the time the Chairman of the Presidency of B&H, lodged the request with the Constitutional Court in which it was requested that it should establish that the Decision of the Government of RS granting consent to the Agreement entered into between Hill & Knowlton International Belgium and the RS and the Memorandum of Agreement entered into between Quinn Gillespie & Associates and the RS, Conclusion of the RS Government, Memorandum of Agreement entered into between Quinn Gillespie & Associates and the RS and its Annex I, item 614700 of the RS Budget for 2008 and item 614700 of the RS Budget for 2009 (on the allocation of funds for the RS's representation abroad), and the activities of the RS carried out in the USA either directly or indirectly on the basis of the Memorandum of Agreement through the authorized Agent Quinn Gillespie & Associates and directed towards the government, institutions and officials of the US and officials of some international organizations, are inconsistent with Articles III(1)(a) and (b), III(3)(b), V(3)(a) and (c) and V(4)(a) of the Constitution of B&H. The majority (7-2) of the Court decided against the applicant. In its decision, among other things, the Court stated:

An important aspect of the Decision was the fact that the request was unanimously found to be admissible since it was held that a series of formal acts and activities undertaken by one of the Entities may raise an issue of existence of a dispute between the Entity and B&H over an issue under the Constitution of B&H in respect of which the Constitutional Court of BiH has sole jurisdiction to decide.

In her dissenting opinion, joint by judge Mirsad Ćeman, judge Seada Palavrić criticized the Court for not giving a definition of foreign policy and foreign trade policy, since, in her opinion, only a detailed interpretation could assist in determination of the exclusive competence of B&H in this area. She also reiterated the earlier decisions of the Court with regards the lack of international personality of the RS, while the analysis of the relevant documentation show that RS had acted not as an integral part of B&H but as an independent state conducting its foreign policy in an nontransparent matter.

Decision on the constitutionality of communication of RS with United Nations Security Council

On 24 November 2009, Beriz Belkić, at the time the Deputy Chairman of the House of Representatives of the Parliamentary Assembly of B&H, filed a request with the Constitutional Court for review of the constitutionality of the Second Report of the RS submitted to the UNSC on the Situation in B&H of 16 November 2009, as well as for review of the constitutionality of the activities of the RS taken either directly or indirectly through its authorized agent and directed towards the UNSC. The majority (5-3) of the Court decided against the applicant. In its decision, among other things, the Court stated:

Importantly, the Court held that the acts and activities taken by one of the Entities, even of political nature, may raise an issue as to the existence of a dispute between the Entity and B&H over a matter under the Constitution of B&H, which only the Constitutional Court is competent to resolve.

Judge Mirsad Ćeman filed a dissenting opinion, joint by judges Seada Palavrić and Valerija Galić, in which he criticized the Court for not defining the term "foreign policy". Also, in his opinion the challenged activities of the RS included the matters and positions which, by their nature, fall within the scope of the foreign policy of B&H and, as such, they are within the sole responsibility of the B&H. He also held that the Government of RS, through the preparation and submission of the challenged Second Report, acted unilaterally on the international scene, which constituted an interference with the responsibilities of the State of B&H by the Entity. Finally, he did not agree with the majority that no legally relevant activity based on the challenged Report was taken to the detriment of the constitutional position of the B&H, since the preparation and submission of the challenged Second Report constituted such an activity and the damages for B&H arising from that activity are reflected in damages to the constitutional capacity, sovereignty and international subjectivity of B&H as a state.

References

External links
Constitutional Court of Bosnia and Herzegovina
 Constitution of Bosnia and Herzegovina

Decisions
Bosnia and Herzegovina Constitutional Court
Decisions of the Constitutional Court